Bill Walsh is the name of:

 Bill Walsh (American football, born 1927) (1927–2012), player at University of Notre Dame, player and coach in the National Football League
 Bill Walsh (American football coach) (1931–2007), head coach of San Francisco 49ers and at Stanford University
 Bill Walsh (author) (1961–2017), American author and newspaper editor
 Bill Walsh (firefighter) (born 1957), American firefighter and television actor
 Bill Walsh (footballer) (1923–2014), former English footballer
 Bill Walsh (hurler) (1922–2013), Irish hurler
 Bill Walsh (producer) (1913–1975), American film producer
 Bill Walsh, former drummer for punk band Cosmic Psychos

See also
 Billy Walsh (disambiguation)
 William Walsh (disambiguation)
 Bill Walsh College Football, a 1993 American football videogame
 Bill Welsh (1911–2000), television announcer
 William Welsh (disambiguation)